The Tulua language, also written Toolooa and Dulua, and also known as Narung, is an extinct Aboriginal Australian language of Queensland in Australia 

Dappil (Dapil) may be another name for the same language; they are treated as such by Terrill (1998). However, the Dappil and Tulua people were possibly the same peoples, and it is not certain what the names referred to. For example, Toolooa and Dappil in Mathew (1913) correspond to Dapil in Kite and Wurm (2004).

, AIATSIS gives priority to the name "Tulua" for the language, and Tulua is one of 20 languages prioritised as part of the Priority Languages Support Project, being undertaken by First Languages Australia and funded by the Department of Communications and the Arts. The project aims to "identify and document critically-endangered languages — those languages for which little or no documentation exists, where no recordings have previously been made, but where there are living speakers".

References

Waka–Kabic languages
Extinct languages of Queensland